Yedingham is a village and former civil parish halfway between West Knapton and Allerston, nine miles north-east of Malton. It is now in the parish of Ebberston and Yedingham, in the Ryedale district of North Yorkshire, but was historically part of the East Riding of Yorkshire until 1974. In 1961 the parish had a population of 95.

History
The village name is thought to derive from Old English, once meaning 'Homestead of Eada and his people'.

On 1 April 1986 the parish was abolished and merged with Ebberston to form "Ebberston and Yedingham".

There is a small Church dedicated to St John the Baptist and the River Derwent flows through to the north of the village. The original bridge crossing the Derwent was built in 1731. This was replaced by the current bridge built in 1970.

The village hall can be found next to The Providence, a public house.

To the north of the village lies the remains of the Yedingham Priory. This was home to Benedictine nuns from 1163 to 1539.

See also
 Yedingham Priory

References

External links

Villages in North Yorkshire
Former civil parishes in North Yorkshire
Ryedale